Pacific bonito, Sarda lineolata, is a marine species of bonito that is a game fighter but not highly thought of as a food fish. While it has been considered to be a subspecies of Sarda chiliensis, recent treatments recognize it as a species, S. lineolata.

It is colored blue to violet above, with metallic luster becoming silvery ventrally. It has ten or eleven stripes on its back running obliquely from the dorsum forward, and fifteen or more rakers below the angle on the first gill. The first dorsal fin is contiguous with the second and longer than the head. The caudal peduncle is slender, and the body entirely scaled. It has no teeth on the vomer. It has a small keel on either side of the median keel on the sides of the caudal peduncle, and six to eight finlets on the dorsal and ventral surfaces of the caudal peduncle. The maximum length is about 40 inches and weight 25 pounds. It is found anywhere from inshore to about 100 miles offshore from northern Vancouver Island to Mexico, though it is not normally found north of Point Conception. It usually travels in schools. Fish and squid are its main diet. It is caught by trolling and still fishing, using feather lures, spoons, or live bait.

References
 
 H. J. Rayner "Pacific Bonito." The Wise Fishermen's Encyclopedia (1951).

Scombridae
Fish described in 1858